Bibliography of works on Dracula is a listing of non-fiction literary works about the book Dracula or derivative works about its titular vampire Count Dracula.

Books
Full books

Chapters

Magazines
Serialized
 

 

Single issues
 

 

 

 

 

 

 

Articles

Essays

See also
 Bibliography of works on Stephen King
 Bram Stoker Award for Best Non-Fiction

External links
Bibliography at the Bram Stoker Estate

Bibliographies of historical novels
Dracula
Horror fiction lists